Parkers Settlement is an unincorporated community and census-designated place in Robinson Township, Posey County, in the U.S. state of Indiana.

History
A post office was established at Parkers Settlement in 1851, and remained in operation until it was discontinued in 1902.

Geography

Demographics

References

Populated places in Posey County, Indiana
Census-designated places in Indiana